Caroline was built at Cochin, British India, in 1825. She sailed to the United Kingdom and took up British registry. She then sailed between England and India under a license from the British East India Company (EIC). She made one voyage transporting convicts from Ireland to Australia. Later, she carried immigrants to Australia. She was wrecked in March 1850.

Design 
Caroline was built by John Crookenden and was registered at Calcutta on 21 November 1825. She was built of teak, was sheathed in yellow metal, and had two decks. She had three masts and was square rigged.

Career 
Caroline first appeared in Lloyd's Register (LR) in 1827. 

A ship named Caroline, under the command of Captain Howey, left London on 19 April 1828 and arrived in Sydney on 12 September 1828, carrying a cargo of general merchandise, livestock, and passengers including immigrants. Another source states that the ship sailed from Plymouth, also on 19 April 1828, under the command of Captain Howard. 

Under the command of James Fewson, she left St Katharine Docks, London on 2 June 1829, stopping at Worthing, Sussex on 4 June to load additional cargo. She left on 6 June and after stopping over at Rio de Janeiro, arrived at the Swan River Colony on 12 October. She was carrying some 66 passengers.

Caroline left British registry .

On her only convict voyage, Caroline, under the command of Alexander Macdonald and surgeon George Birnie, she departed Cork, Ireland on 15 April 1833 and arrived in Sydney on 6 August. She embarked 120 female convicts, none of whom died en route.

She returned to British registry in 1836. She carried immigrants and passengers to Adelaide Port Philip on some of her voyages.

Fate 
A report from Honolulu dated 26 March 1850 reported that Caroline, Perry, master, had wrecked in a gale. She had been sailing from Adelaide to California. Her passengers were saved, as were all but one of her crew.

Citations and references 
Citations

References
 
 
 

1825 ships
British ships built in India
Migrant ships to Australia
Convict ships to New South Wales
Age of Sail merchant ships
Merchant ships of the United Kingdom
Maritime incidents in March 1850